Moa Anna Maria Carlebecker (born 10 November 1988), better known by her stage name Cazzi Opeia is a Swedish DJ, artist, singer and songwriter.

Life and career

1988–2015: Early life and career beginnings 
Moa Anna "Cazzi Opeia" Carlebecker was born in southern part of Sweden and grew up traveling around Europe and in the United States with her family. She is a cousin of presenter Gry Forssell. The name Cazzi Opeia comes from the star constellation Cassiopeia.

She took part in the sixth season of Idol in 2009. She reached the semi-finals where she was beaten by Mariette Hansson and Erika Selin.

She was discovered by the producer Billy Mann and the record company Macho Records, who previously worked with Pink, Cher, and Jessica Simpson. Her first single "I Belong To You" became a hit when the artist DJ Tiësto took the remix on his Club Life record, giving Cazzi Opeia a name globally. She has also been praised for her style and music by celebrity blogger Perez Hilton in connection with her dubstep cover by Lady Gaga's hit song "Judas".

2016–2017: "Batman & Robin" 
In 2016, Carlebecker signed an exclusive worldwide publishing agreement with EKKO Music Rights Europe. 
She also signed an exclusive worldwide record deal with Superior Recordings licensed to Cosmos Music Group & The Orchard in 2017. She released the single "Batman & Robin" together with Jin X Jin.

2017–2018: "Wild Ones" and "Rich" 
On 5 May 2017 Cazzi Opeia was featured on artist 528's track titled "Meat". The track was released by independent record label "Hurdy Gurdy Noise".

Carlebecker's single "Wild Ones" released by Superior Recordings / Cosmos Music on 1 December 2017 and featured the "Wild Ones" track and the instrumental version as well Along with the song being released, Cazzi Opeia teamed up with the Swedish Space Corporation and broadcast her single into space, more specifically in the direction of the Cassiopeia constellation.

Carlebecker's single "Rich" released by Superior Recordings / Cosmos Music on 16 November 2018.

2022: Melodifestivalen 
Carlebecker competed in Melodifestivalen 2022 with the song "I Can't Get Enough". She performed in Heat 3 on 19 February 2022, qualifying to the semi-final on 5 March, from which she qualified for the final on 12 March 2022, when she finished 9th.

Discography

As a songwriter 
2023: Loreen - "Tattoo" released by Universal Music Group
2022: AleXa - "Back in Vogue" from the mini album Girls Gone Vogue released by ZB Label
2022: NCT 127 - "2 baddies" released by SM Entertainment 
2022: Jo Yu-ri - "Love Shhh!" from the mini album Op.22 Y-Waltz : in Major released by Wake One Entertainment
2022: LE SSERAFIM - "The Great Mermaid" from the mini album Fearless released by Source Music
2022: AleXa - "Wonderland" released by ZB Label
2022: Ailee - "525" released by Rocket3 Entertainment
2022: Trendz - "TNT (Truth & Trust)" released by	INTERPARK MUSIC PLUS
2022: Momoland - "Yummy Yummy Love" released by MLD Entertainment
2022: Ailee - "Murder On The Dancefloor" released by Rocket3 Entertainment
2022: AleXa - "Tattoo" released by ZB Label
2022: Enhypen - "Blessed-Cursed" released by Big Hit Entertainment
2021: Oh!GG - "Melody" released by SM Entertainment
2021: NCT Dream - "Diggity" released by SM Entertainment
2021: Magicour - "Getcha" released by	Whole World Media Japan
2021: Cherry Bullet - "Pom Na Ge / Keep Your Head Up" released by FNC Entertainment
2021: Victon - "Flip A Coin" released by PlayM Entertainment
2021: Weeekly - "Holiday Party" released by PlayM Entertainment
2021: Red Velvet - "Knock On Wood" released by SM Entertainment
2021: LOONA - "Be Honest" released by Blockberry Creative
2021: Cryptid TV-show	"Get Out Of My Face"	
2021: VERIVERY - "Underdog" released by Jellyfish Entertainment
2021: Pentagon (South Korean band) - "1+1 (One + One)" released by Cube Entertainment
2021: WayV - "Good Time" released by SM Entertainment
2021: AleXa - "Xtra" released by ZB Label
2021: Dwin, Lucky Luke, - "NOTSOBAD" released by	Hi Don't Cry	
2021: NCT 127	- "Gimme Gimme" released by SM Entertainment Japan
2021: Billlie	- "Flipp!ng A Coin" released by Mystic Entertainment
2021: ITZY - "Tennis 0:0" released by	JYP Entertainment
2021: Enhypen - "Tamed-Dashed" from their first full album "Dimension: Dilemma" released by Belift Lab 
2021: Verivery - "Underdog" from the mini album Series 'O' Round 2: Hole released by Jellyfish Entertainment
2021: Red Velvet - "Knock on Wood" from the mini album Queendom released by SM Entertainment
2021: Red Velvet - "Pose" from the mini album Queendom released by SM Entertainment
2021: Red Velvet - "Queendom" from the mini album Queendom released by SM Entertainment
2021: Tomorrow X Together - "LO$ER=LOVER" from The Chaos Chapter: Fight or Escape released by Big Hit Music
2021: Stray Kids – "Secret Secret" from the album Noeasy released by JYP Entertainment
2021: Weeekly – "Holiday Party" from the album Play Game: Holiday released by Play M Entertainment
2021: Enhypen – "Mixed Up" from the album Border: Carnival released by Belift Lab
2021: Enhypen – "Fever" from the album Border: Carnival released by Belift Lab
2021: Itzy – "Tennis (0:0)" from the album Guess Who released by JYP Entertainment
2020: GFriend - "Mago" from the album 回:Walpurgis Night released by Source Music
2020: I-Land - "I&credible" single released by Stone Music Entertainment
2020: WayV - "Unbreakable" from the album Awaken The World released by SM Entertainment
2020: BTS - "We Are Bulletproof: The Eternal" from the album Map of the Soul: 7 released by Big Hit Entertainment
2020: Emma Wu - "Go Home, huh?" released by Avex Taiwan
2020: AleXa - "A.I Trooper" released by ZB Label
2020: The Boyz	- "Break Your Rules" released by Cre.ker Entertainment
2020: Twice - "Shot Clock" released by JYP Entertainment
2020: Twice - "Queen" released by JYP Entertainment
2020: ITZY - "Be In Love" released by JYP Entertainment
2020: VERIVERY - "Photo" released by Jellyfish Entertainment
2020: WayV - "Unbreakable" released by	SM Entertainment
2020: AleXa - "Do Or Die" released by ZB Label
2020: ITZY	- "Surf" released by JYP Entertainment
2020: AleXa - "Kitty Run" released by ZB Label
2020: NCT Dream - "MU DAI RO" released by SM Entertainment
2020: Tomorrow X Together - "Wishlist" released by Big Hit Entertainment
2020: ENHYPEN - "Given-Taken" released by Big Hit Entertainment
2020: ELRIS - "Jackpot" released by HUNUS Entertainment
2019: DJ Antoine - "I Still Want You" released by Global Productions
2019: Eva Parmakova - "Lipstick" released by Virginia Records
2019: Twice "HOT" released by JYP Entertainment
2019: Louam - "Big Loop" released by daWorks Records
2019: Red Velvet - "In & Out" released by SM Entertainment
2019: Red Velvet - "Sunny Side Up!" released by SM Entertainment
2019: Red Velvet - "Milkshake" released by SM Entertainment
2019: GWSN	- "Black Hole" released by Miles Entertainment
2019: DJ Hyo - "Badster" released by SM Entertainment
2019: Red Velvet - "Psycho" from the compilation album The ReVe Festival: Finale released by SM Entertainment
2019: Itzy - "Icy" from the mini-album It'z Icy released by JYP Entertainment
2019: NCT Dream - "119" from the EP We Boom released by SM Entertainment
2019: DJ Hyo - "Badster" single released by SM Entertainment
2019: Sulli - "Goblin" single released by SM Entertainment
2019: Red Velvet - "Sunny Side Up!" from the mini-album The ReVe Festival: Day 1 released by SM Entertainment
2019: TXT- "Blue Orangeade" from the mini-album The Dream Chapter: Star released by Big Hit
2018: NCT Dream - "Drippin'" from the EP We Go Up released by SM Entertainment
2018: Red Velvet - "Power Up" from the mini-album Summer Magic released by SM Entertainment
2018: Red Velvet - "Blue Lemonade" from the mini-album Summer Magic released by SM Entertainment
2018: Twice - "Dance the Night Away" from the album Summer Nights released by JYP Entertainment
2018: DJ Hyo - "Punk Right" Now released by SM Entertainment
2018: SHINee - "You & I" released by SM Entertainment
2018: Gabriel Fontana - "Stilettos On"	
2017: B.A.P - "Moondance" released by TS Entertainment
2017: Eva + Manu - "Alien" released by	EMI Finland
2017: Djamila - "Smalltalk" released by BitStream / Universal
2017: Red Velvet - "Peek-a-Boo" single from the album Perfect Velvet released by SM Entertainment
2017: Twice - "24/7" from the album Twicetagram released by JYP Entertainment
2017: Twice - "Someone Like Me" from the EP Signal released by JYP Entertainment

As an artist 
2022: I Can't Get Enough (EKKO Music Rights/Ingrooves)
2018: Rich (Superior Recordings / Cosmos Music)
2017: Wild Ones (Superior Recordings / Cosmos Music)
2017: Batman & Robin (Superior Recordings / Cosmos Music)
2017: Meat (Vignet Theme from the TV series "Vini Vidi Vici")
2015: Here We Go Again (Capitol Music Group)
2014: Endless Flame (Smilax Publishing Srl)
2012: With You (Macho Records)
2011: Oxygen (Macho Records)
2011: My Heart In 2 (Macho Music)
2010: I Belong To You (Macho Music)

Charting singles

References

External links 
 

1988 births
Living people
English-language singers from Sweden
Musicians from Stockholm
Singers from Stockholm
Swedish dance musicians
Swedish electronic musicians
Swedish women singer-songwriters
Swedish pop singers
Swedish sopranos
Synth-pop singers
Swedish women in electronic music
20th-century Swedish women singers
21st-century Swedish women singers
Melodifestivalen contestants of 2022